Macarostola ida is a moth of the family Gracillariidae. It is known from Australia in the states of New South Wales, Queensland, Western Australia and Victoria. In 2019 it was discovered to have become established in Northland and east Auckland in New Zealand.

The wingspan is about 10 mm. Adults have forewings with a striking pattern of rusty reddish-brown and white. The inner margins of all of the wings are heavily fringed.

The larvae feed on Angophora and Eucalyptus species, including Eucalyptus piperita. They mine the leaves of their host plant.

References

Macarostola
Moths described in 1880